Daniel Gerard Breland (born July 18, 1995), known professionally as Breland, is an American singer, songwriter and record producer of a hybrid of country rap, R&B, gospel, and soul music. His 2019 debut single, "My Truck", rose to prominence the following year after gaining popular attention via social media, reaching No. 26 on Billboards Hot Country Songs chart, and was remixed with Sam Hunt before being certified platinum for sales of one million units as of January 2021.

Breland has released two EPs on Bad Realm Records/Atlantic Records, and his music been streamed on Spotify over 150 million times. He released his debut full-length album Cross Country in September 2022.

Early life and education
Daniel Breland grew up in Burlington Township, New Jersey, the son of two ordained ministers Tonya and Gerard Breland who filled their home with gospel music. At age 14, he entered the Peddie School, a New Jersey boarding school, and was exposed for the first time to secular music in the hip-hop, R&B, country and pop genres. His favorites were 70s soul artists such as Aretha Franklin and Stevie Wonder.

Breland started writing his own songs, a mix of styles he was listening to and liked. He turned down admission to New York University's Clive Davis Institute of Recorded Music to study business at Georgetown University in Washington, DC.  While there, he sang and arranged a cappella with a group called the Phantoms, and was a Residential Advisor.

Musical career
Breland began his career as a professional songwriter while at Georgetown, and in his second year, he met rapper Chinx (Chinx Drugz), an associate of French Montana. One night at Chinx's Far Rockaway, New York home, the rapper left Breland working on music to go perform at his show. He never came back, as Chinx was murdered.

After graduation, he moved to Atlanta. While working a job selling language technology during the day, he wrote music usually until late into the morning hours. Breland taught himself how to produce music on Pro Tools, Logic Pro, and FL Studio. With approximately 2,000 songs in around five years, he made placements with artists such as Trey Songz and wrote nearly half of the tracks on The Golden Child, the debut from Def Jam Recordings R&B artist YK Osiris.

Breland often posted his original material on Instagram. He started the #BrelandVerseChallenge on the app to engage his fans during COVID-19 quarantine. He ended up giving two of his Instagram followers their first major-label writing credit on the song "In the Woulds", an R&B and pop song featuring Chase Rice and Lauren Alaina, two country music artists. However, newcomer country rap artist Rvshvd was originally intended to be featured on "In the Woulds" before Chase Rice was added to the final version, despite this, he still received songwriting credits for it.

In September 2019, he wrote the song "My Truck", about the truck culture found in rural America. The music was a blend of hip hop and country music and when he posted the song on Instagram, he received a great response, and realized he had found his niche with the country-trap sub-genre.

"I just felt like it was time for people to change their perspective on what country music is and what country music can be, because there is an audience of country music listeners under 30 who believe Black Lives Matter," he told the Associated Press. "My Truck" reached No. 26 on the Billboard Hot Country Songs chart.

In an interview on the television program Extra at the time, Breland termed his musical hybrid sound as cross country, while most media categorizes him as country-trap.

Signing with Bad Realm/Atlantic Records, Breland signed with SALXCO Management, and released a remix of "My Truck" that features country music's Sam Hunt. "My Truck" has over 2.6 million U.S. streams, 2,000 downloads sold and 2.8 million radio audience impressions, according to Nielsen Audio, and hit No. 1 on Spotify's Viral 50 Chart in February.

In May 2020, Breland's self-titled EP was released by Bad Realm/Atlantic Records. The music crossed genres of country, hip hop, R&B, and pop with songs like the singles "My Truck" and "Horseride", as well as fan favorites "Hot Sauce" and "In the Woulds." Producers included Sam Sumser (Lizzo, Jason Derulo), Sean Small (Lizzo, Usher), Charlie Handsome (Post Malone, Kanye West, Khalid), as well as country singers Mitchell Tenpenny and Walker Hayes. The EP charted at No. 48 on Billboards Top Country Albums chart.

The EP Rage & Sorrow followed with a June 2020 release. Breland's theme on the EP was derived from the racial unrest prompted by the murders of George Floyd and Ahmaud Arbery, and the killing of Breonna Taylor. "Intro" features a line from the 1960s blues song "Tobacco Road", and has a rock guitar. Other songs include "Real Men Don't Cry", and "A Message". Producers include Carson Thatcher (Parson James, Andy Grammer), Brian Kennedy, and Rob Persaud.

Breland and Keith Urban co-wrote two songs for Urban's September 2020 album The Speed of Now Part 1, including the song "Out the Cage" that has Breland adding vocals, and Nile Rodgers's on rhythm guitar, and the track "Soul Food".

In September 2020, Breland joined Apple Music Country as an on-air host for his own radio show called Land of the Bre.

Breland released a brand new collaboration with Thomas Rhett "Praise the Lord" in March 2022. His debut album Cross Country was released on September 9, 2022.

Discography
Albums

Extended plays

Singles

Featured singlesNotes'

Awards and nominations

CMT Music Awards

!
|-
| rowspan="3" | 2022
| "Cross Country"
|  Breakthrough Video of the Year
| 
| rowspan="3" | 
|-
| "Friendship Train" (with Gladys Knight and Mickey Guyton)	
| rowspan="2" | CMT Performance of the Year
| 
|-
| "Ride wit Me"  (with Nelly, Kane Brown and Blanco Brown)
| 
|}

GMA Dove Awards

!
|-
| 2022
| "Sunday"
| Contemporary Gospel Recorded Song of the Year
| 
| 
|-
|}

Guest appearances

Notes

References

External links
 

Living people
1995 births
African-American male singer-songwriters
Atlantic Records artists
Country rap musicians
African-American country musicians
Singer-songwriters from New Jersey
Country musicians from New Jersey
Peddie School alumni
People from Burlington Township, New Jersey
McDonough School of Business alumni
21st-century African-American male singers
African-American Christians